Kevin Nitzlnader (born 3 February 1993) is an Austrian footballer who plays for WSG Swarovski Tirol II.

External links
 
 

1993 births
Living people
Austrian footballers
Association football midfielders
FC Wacker Innsbruck (2002) players
WSG Tirol players
Austrian Football Bundesliga players